Uncinia lacustris is a species of plant in the family Cyperaceae. It is endemic to Ecuador.  Its natural habitat is subtropical or tropical high-altitude grassland.

References

lacustris
Flora of Ecuador
Endangered plants
Plants described in 1995
Taxonomy articles created by Polbot